Painkiller or analgesic is a group of drugs.

Painkillers or pain killer may also refer to:

Games 
 Painkiller (video game), a 2004 first-person shooter for the PC and Xbox
 Painkiller: Resurrection, an expansion pack for the 2004 game
 Painkiller: Hell & Damnation, a remake of the 2004 game

Music

Bands 
 Painkiller (band), a band led by John Zorn and Bill Laswell

Albums 
 Pain Killer (Energy Orchard album), 1995
 Pain Killer (Krokus album), 1978
 Pain Killer (Little Big Town album), 2014
 Pain Killer (Moumoon album), 2013
 Painkiller (Jim Bianco album), 2006
 Painkiller (Judas Priest album), 1990
 Painkiller, a 2012 re-release edition of the EP Russian Roulette, or the song

Songs 
 "Pain Killer" (Iceage song), 2018
 "Painkillerr" a song by Polish band Mech
 "Pain Killer" (Little Big Town song), 2015
 "Pain Killer" (Turin Brakes song), 2003
 "Painkiller" (Freestylers song), 2006
 "Painkiller" (Jason Derulo song), 2015
 "Painkiller" (Judas Priest song), 1990
 "Painkiller" (Ruel song), 2019
 "Painkiller" (Three Days Grace song), 2014
 "Painkiller", a song by Depeche Mode, the B-side of "Barrel of a Gun"
 "Painkiller", a song by Dreamers from This Album Does Not Exist

Television 
 Painkiller (TV series), an upcoming 2022 American drama limited series
 "Painkiller" (Black Lightning episode)
 Painkiller (Arrowverse)

Other uses 
 Painkiller (cocktail), a rum cocktail
 Painkiller (comics), a fictional DC Comics supervillain 
 Painkiller (magazine), a Chinese heavy metal music magazine
 The Painkiller (play), by Sean Foley, adapted from Francis Veber's Le Contract
 Painkiller (film), a 2011 short film starring Benedict Wong
 Painkillers (film), a 2018 film directed by Roxy Shih